Byasa nevilli, the Nevill's windmill, is a butterfly found in India that belongs to the windmills genus (Byasa), comprising tailed black swallowtail butterflies with white spots and red submarginal crescents.

Range
North east India (Assam), Myanmar (Shan states) and western China.

Status
It is very common in western China and very rare in India. This butterfly is protected in India though it is not known to be threatened.

Taxonomy
No separate subspecies have been described.

Description
The wingspan is 100–120 mm. In appearance it is similar to the great windmill (Byasa dasarada), but is smaller. The tail is not red-tipped. It also resembles the great windmill subspecies B. d. ravana, Moore, but is smaller, with the markings also proportionately smaller. The male differs as follows: the subterminal series of lunules on the hindwing are crimson or vermilion red, never white or partly white as in B. d. ravana; sexual abdominal fold within white, not blackish brown; the subterminal red lunule in interspace 3 very often missing. Female resembles the male rather than the female of B. d. ravana but the white rectangular markings in interspaces 5 and 6 are whiter. From B. d. ravana female it differs in the complete absence of the white discal spots in interspaces 1, 2, 3 and 4. In both sexes the tail is black without any red spot.

See also
Papilionidae
List of butterflies of India
List of butterflies of India (Papilionidae)

Notes

References

External links

 Global Butterfly Information System - Text, images including holotype of chentsong Oberthür, 1886 and type information on stenoptera Chou & Gu, 1994

Byasa
Butterflies of Asia
Taxa named by James Wood-Mason
Butterflies described in 1882